Best of April Wine is a compilation album by the Canadian rock band April Wine, released in 2003.

Track listing 
All tracks written by Myles Goodwyn unless otherwise noted.
 "I Like to Rock"	
 "Roller"
 "Just Between You and Me"
 "All Over Town"
 "Say Hello"
 "Oowatanite" (J. Clench)
 "Enough is Enough"
 "Tonite is a Wonderful Time to Fall in Love"
 "You Won't Dance with Me"
 "Anything You Want, You Got It"
 "I Wouldn't Want to Lose Your Love"
 "Rock n' Roll is a Vicious Game"

Personnel 
 Myles Goodwyn – lead & background vocals, guitar, keyboards
 Brian Greenway – vocals, guitar, harmonica
 Gary Moffet – guitar, background vocals
 Jim Clench – vocals, bass
 Steve Lang – bass, background vocals
 Jerry Mercer – drums & percussion, background vocals

Various producers 
 Myles Goodwyn – producer
 Nick Blagona – producer
 Mike Stone – producer
 Gene Cornish – producer
 Dino Danelli – producer

References 

April Wine albums
2003 greatest hits albums
Albums produced by Mike Stone (record producer)
Albums produced by Myles Goodwyn
MCA Records compilation albums
Albums produced by Nick Blagona